Shokeen is a surname. Notable people with the surname include:

Devender Singh Shokeen (born 1967), Indian bureaucrat and politician
Hrithik Shokeen (born 2000), Indian cricketer
Manoj Kumar Shokeen (born 1967), Indian politician, Bharatiya Janata Party leader
Nishant Shokeen, Indian film and television actor 
Raghuvinder Shokeen, Indian politician, Member of the Delhi Legislative Assembly 
Vivek Shokeen (born 1987), Indian tennis player

See also
 Shaukeen

Indian surnames